Weymouth Street Hospital is a private hospital in London, England. Along with its consulting rooms at 9 Harley Street, it is owned by Phoenix Hospital Group, which bought 25 Harley Street in January 2018.

History
The hospital was founded by Dr Aubrey Bristow and Mr Ghassan Alusi, two consultants from St Bartholomew's Hospital, London and opened after a complete rebuild in 2010. The hospital was featured in a television programme called Transformation Street in January 2018 which featured patients having transgender surgery.

References

External links

Official site

Hospitals in London
Private hospitals in the United Kingdom